Riisitunturi National Park is a national park in Posio, Finnish Lapland. The park is in a mountainous area, and there are also many swamps, especially hillside swamps.

The only wilderness hut in the park is located near the twin-peak of Riisitunturi, .

See also 
 List of national parks of Finland
 Protected areas of Finland

References

External links
 
 www.nationalparks.fi – Riisitunturi National Park
 www.posiolapland.com – Riisitunturi National Park

National parks of Finland
Posio
Protected areas established in 1982
Geography of Lapland (Finland)
Tourist attractions in Lapland (Finland)
1982 establishments in Finland
Ramsar sites in Finland